Revision Control System (RCS) is an early implementation of a version control system (VCS). It is a set of UNIX commands that allow multiple users to develop and maintain program code or documents.  With RCS, users can make their own revisions of a document, commit changes, and merge them. RCS was originally developed for programs but is also useful for text documents or configuration files that are frequently revised.

History

Development 
RCS was first released in 1982
by Walter F. Tichy at Purdue University. It was an alternative tool to the then-popular Source Code Control System (SCCS) which was nearly the first version control software tool (developed in 1972 by early Unix developers). RCS is currently maintained by the GNU Project.

An innovation in RCS is the adoption of reverse deltas. Instead of storing every revision in a file like SCCS does with interleaved deltas, RCS stores a set of edit instructions to go back to an earlier version of the file. Tichy claims that it is faster for most cases because the recent revisions are used more often.

Legal and licensing
Initially (through version 3, which was distributed in 4.3BSD), its license prohibited redistribution without written permission from Walter Tichy:

A READ_ME file accompanied some versions of RCS which further restricted distribution, e.g., in 4.3BSD-Reno.

Ca. 1989, the RCS license was altered to something similar to the contemporary BSD licenses, as seen by comments in the source code.

RCS 4.3, released 26 July 1990, was distributed "under license by the Free Software Foundation", under the terms of the GPL.

Behavior

Mode of operation 
RCS operates only on single files.  It has no way of working with an entire project, so it does not support atomic commits affecting multiple files. Although it provides branching for individual files, the version syntax is cumbersome. Instead of using branches, many teams just use the built-in locking mechanism and work on a single head branch.

Usage 
RCS revolves around the usage of "revision groups" or sets of files that have been checked-in via the co (checkout) and ci (check-in) commands. By default, a checked-in file is removed and replaced with a ",v" file (so foo.rb when checked in becomes foo.rb,v) which can then be checked out by anyone with access to the revision group.  RCS files (again, files with the extension ",v") reflect the main file with additional metadata on its first lines.  Once checked in, RCS stores revisions in a tree structure that can be followed so that a user can revert a file to a previous form if necessary.

Advantages 
 Simple structure and easy to work with 
 Revision saving is not dependent on a central repository

Disadvantages 
 There is little security, in the sense that the version history can be edited by the users.
 Only one user can work on a file at a time.

Related tools and successors

First generation

SCCS (first released in 1973) and DSEE (considered a predecessor of Atria ClearCase), described in 1984, are two other notable VCS software tools. These tools, along with RCS, are generally considered the first generation of VCS as automated software tools.

Second generation
After the first generation VCS, tools such as CVS and Subversion, which feature a locally centralized repository, could be considered as the second generation VCS. Specifically, CVS (Concurrent Versions System) was developed on top of RCS structure, improving scalability of the tool for larger groups, and later PRCS, a simpler CVS-like tool which also uses RCS-like files, but improves upon the delta compression by using Xdelta instead.

By 2006 or so, Subversion was considered to be the most popular and widely in use VCS tool from this generation and filled important weaknesses of CVS. Later SVK developed with the goal of remote contribution feature, but still the foundation of its design were similar to its predecessors.

Third generation
As Internet connectivity improved and geographically distributed software development became more common, tools emerged that did not rely on a shared central project repository. These allow users to maintain independent repositories (or forks) of a project and communicate revisions via changesets.
BitKeeper, Git, Monotone, darcs, Mercurial, and bzr
are some examples of third generation version control systems.

Notes

References 

Notes

 Walter F. Tichy: RCS--A System for Version Control. In: Software: Practice and Experience. July 1985. Volume 15. Number 7. Pages 637–654. References to the paper at CiteSeer alternate link to paper

Further reading
 Don Bolinger, Tan Bronson, Applying RCS and SCCS - From Source Control to Project Control. O'Reilly, 1995.
 Walter F. Tichy, RCS—A System for Version Control, 1985
 Paul Heinlein, RCS HOWTO, 2004

External links

 
 Original RCS at Purdue
 

1985 software
Free version control software
GNU Project software
Software using the GPL license
Types of tools used in software development